Susana Molinari Ligmabalz (pseudonym, Alma del Fiore) was an Argentine Spanish, Italian and French language writer active during the 1940s.

Works
 El Jardín del Silencio (The Garden of the Silence), 1939 as Alma del Fiore
 La Clef du Paradis (The Key of Paradise), 1939
 Au Seuil de l'avenir (In Future's Threshold),  1940
 Crímenes ocultos (Hidden Crimes),  1942

Argentine writers in French
Italian-language writers
Argentine women writers
Year of birth unknown
Year of death unknown